Sam Anton (born 30 December 1985) is an Indian film director and screenwriter who predominantly works in Tamil films. He debuted with a horror comedy movie titled Darling in 2015 featuring composer G. V. Prakash Kumar marking his acting debut and Nikki Galrani with her Tamil film debut. Darling was a blockbuster after which he worked yet again with the composer turned hero for his second film titled Enakku Innoru Per Irukku in 2016.Sam Anton's next project's named 100 starring Atharvaa and Hansika Motwani and Gurkha starring Yogi Babu as lead released in 2019.

Career 
Sam did his schooling in Don Bosco, Egmore and graduated from SRM Engineering college after which he started his career in a Television channel with a reality show that still continues as a series. Noticing his work K.E Gnanavel Raja from Studio Green got him the opportunity of Darling in association with Allu Aravind's Geetha Arts that became a massive hit that year.

Filmography 

 As actor
Sarabham (2014)

References

External links

Tamil cinema
Living people
Indian film directors
Tamil film directors
Indian screenwriters
1985 births